This article lists the prime ministers of Bangladesh, and includes persons sworn into the office as Prime Minister of Bangladesh following the Proclamation of Bangladeshi Independence in 1971.

List of officeholders 
Political parties

Other factions

Status

See also 
 Caretaker government of Bangladesh
 Chief Advisor
 Prime Minister of Bengal
 Politics of Bangladesh
 President of Bangladesh
 List of presidents of Bangladesh
 Vice President of Bangladesh
 Prime Minister of Bangladesh

Notes

External links 
 World Statesmen – Bangladesh

Bangladesh

Prime Ministers